Franz Kemter (21 February 1922 – 28 February 2008) was an Austrian gymnast. He competed in eight events at the 1952 Summer Olympics.

References

1922 births
2008 deaths
Austrian male artistic gymnasts
Olympic gymnasts of Austria
Gymnasts at the 1952 Summer Olympics
People from Dornbirn
Sportspeople from Vorarlberg
20th-century Austrian people